Rehov is a settlement in northern Israel. 

Rehov may also refer to:

Tel Rehov, site of the ancient city of Rehov in the Jordan Valley, Israel 
Tel Kabri, an ancient mound in Israel; the Canaanite (Bronze Age) city there was possibly called Rehov
Pierre Rehov, French–Israeli documentary filmmaker, director and novelist

See also
 
 Rehovë (disambiguation), several villages in Albania